Jean Marcel Honoré (13 August 1920 – 28 February 2013) was a cardinal of the Roman Catholic Church and a former archbishop of Tours. He was born in Saint-Brice-en-Coglès.

He was ordained on 29 June 1943 after studying at the seminary in Rennes, and from 1958 to 1964 was secretary general of the National Commission for Religious Education and director of the National Centre of Religious Teaching.  He was made Bishop of Évreux in 1972 and Archbishop of Tours in 1981. Honoré was known as a specialist in the works of Cardinal Newman.

In 1990, Honoré recognized the Little Sisters Disciples of the Lamb as a public association of the Christian faithful. He went on to promote the group's cause in Rome.

Honoré retired as Archbishop of Tours in 1997 at the age of 76. Honoré was created cardinal by Pope John Paul II in 2001. Honoré died on 28 February 2013.

References

1920 births
2013 deaths
Archbishops of Tours
20th-century Roman Catholic archbishops in France
Bishops of Évreux
21st-century French cardinals
Cardinals created by Pope John Paul II